Yiannis Gouras (1771 – 1826) was a Greek military leader during the Greek War of Independence.

A cousin of Panourgias, he distinguished himself in the battles in eastern Continental Greece, but became notorious for his invasion of the Peloponnese during the Greek civil wars of 1824–25 and his murder of his former chief, Odysseas Androutsos.

He was killed during the Second Siege of the Acropolis.

He was buried in a monastery in Salamis.

References

1771 births
1826 deaths
Greek military leaders of the Greek War of Independence
Greek military personnel killed in action
Central Greece in the Greek War of Independence
People from Kallieis